Heteromala is a genus of moths of the family Erebidae. The genus was erected by George Hampson in 1895.

Species
Heteromala rougeoti Viette, 1979 Madagascar
Heteromala thyrophora Hampson, 1895 India (Sikkim, Meghalaya)

References

Calpinae